Burgundian War may refer to:

 Burgundian Wars (1474-77)
 Cologne Diocesan Feud (1473-80)
 Armagnac–Burgundian Civil War (1407-35)